The 1964 Copa del Generalísimo Juvenil was the 14th staging of the youth football tournament. The competition began on May 24, 1964, and ended on July 7, 1964, with the final.

First round

|}

Quarterfinals

|}

Semifinals

|}

Final

|}

Final Replay

Copa del Rey Juvenil de Fútbol
Juvenil